Diporiphora is a genus of lizards in the family Agamidae. Most species in the genus are endemic to Australia, but two (D. australis and D. bilineata) are also found in New Guinea.

Species

The genus includes these 28 species which are recognized as being valid:

Diporiphora adductus Doughty, Kealley & Melville, 2012 – Carnarvon dragon
Diporiphora albilabris Storr, 1974  – white-lipped two-line dragon, tar tar lizard
Diporiphora ameliae Emmott, Couper, Melville & Chapple, 2012
Diporiphora amphiboluroides Lucas & C. Frost, 1902 – mulga dragon
Diporiphora australis (Steindachner, 1867) – Tommy roundhead, eastern two-line dragon
Diporiphora bennettii (Gray, 1845) – Kimberley sandstone dragon, robust two-line dragon
Diporiphora bilineata Gray, 1842 – northern two-line dragon, two-lined dragon
Diporiphora carpentariensis Melville, Date, Horner & Doughty, 2019 – Gulf two-lined dragon
Diporiphora convergens Storr, 1974 – Crystal Creek two-lined dragon
Diporiphora gracilis Melville, Date, Horner & Doughty, 2019 – gracile two-lined dragon
Diporiphora granulifera Melville, Date, Horner & Doughty, 2019 – granulated two-lined dragon
Diporiphora jugularis Macleay, 1877 – black-throated two-pored dragon
Diporiphora lalliae Storr, 1974 – northern deserts dragon, Lally's two-line dragon
Diporiphora linga Houston, 1977 – pink two-line dragon
Diporiphora magna Storr, 1974 – yellow-sided two-lined dragon
Diporiphora margaretae Storr, 1974
Diporiphora nobbi (Witten, 1972) – nobbi lashtail, nobbi
Diporiphora pallida Melville, Date, Horner & Doughty, 2019 – pale two-pored dragon
Diporiphora paraconvergens Doughty, Kealley & Melville, 2012 – grey-striped western desert dragon
Diporiphora perplexa Melville, Date, Horner & Doughty, 2019 – Kimberley rock dragon
Diporiphora phaeospinosa Edwards & Melville, 2011
Diporiphora pindan Storr, 1980 – Pindan two-line dragon, Pindan dragon
Diporiphora reginae Glauert, 1959 – plain-backed two-line dragon
Diporiphora sobria Storr, 1974 – northern savannah two-pored dragon
Diporiphora superba Storr, 1974 – superb two-line dragon
Diporiphora valens Storr, 1980 – southern Pilbara spinifex dragon, southern Pilbara tree dragon, Pilbara two-line dragon
Diporiphora vescus Doughty, Kealley & Melville, 2012 – northern Pilbara tree dragon
Diporiphora winneckei Lucas & C. Frost, 1896 – canegrass dragon, canegrass two-line dragon, blue-lined dragon, Winnecke's two-pored dragon

References

Further reading
Gray JE (1842). "Description of some hitherto unrecorded species of Australian Reptiles and Batrachians". Zoological Miscellany 51-57. (Diporiphora, new genus, pp. 53–54).

Diporiphora
Lizard genera
Taxa named by John Edward Gray